Siphonorhinidae is a family of millipede in the order Siphonophorida. There are at least 4 genera and about 12 described species in Siphonorhinidae.

Genera
These four genera belong to the family Siphonorhinidae:
 Illacme Cook & Loomis, 1928
 Kleruchus Attems, 1938
 Nematozonium Verhoeff, 1939
 Siphonorhinus Pocock, 1894

References

Further reading

 
 
 
 

Siphonophorida
Millipedes of North America
Articles created by Qbugbot
Millipede families